Kumpati S. Narendra is an American control theorist, who currently holds the Harold W. Cheel Professorship of Electrical Engineering at Yale University. He received the Richard E. Bellman Control Heritage Award in 2003. He is noted "for pioneering contributions to stability theory, adaptive and learning systems theory". He is also well recognized for his research work towards learning including Neural Networks and Learning Automata.

Narendra obtained his Ph.D. at Harvard University in 1959. He has been the advisor of 47 doctoral students and 35 postdoctoral and visiting fellows. Of the 47 students, four were at Harvard University and thirty nine were at Yale University. Four others who completed their work under his direction received their degrees from other universities.

Research areas
Nonlinear dynamical systems
Artificial neural networks
Learning automata
Adaptive control
Stability theory

Honors and awards

Franklin V. Taylor Award (IEEE SMC Society), 1972
Fellow, IEEE, 1979
Fellow, IEE (UK), 1981
George S. Axelby Outstanding Paper Award (IEEE Control Systems Society), 1988
John R. Ragazzini Education Award (American Automatic Control Council), 1990
Outstanding Paper Award of the Neural Network Council (IEEE), 1991
Neural Network Leadership Award (International Neural Network Society), 1994
Distinguished Visiting Scientist (Jet Propulsion Laboratory), 1994-1995
The Bode Prize/Lecture (IEEE Control Systems Society), 1995
(Honorary) Doctor of Science (Anna University, formerly University of Madras), 1995
Distinguished Speaker (Texas A&M), 1997
Life Fellow (IEEE), 1997
Distinguished Speaker (University of Virginia), 2001
Harold W. Cheel Professor of Electrical Engineering (Yale University), 2003
Richard E. Bellman Control Heritage Award (AACC), 2003
Walton Fellow, Ireland (2007)
(Honorary) Doctor of Science (University of Ireland, Maynooth), 2007
Neural Networks Pioneer Award (IEEE Computational Intelligence Society), 2008

References

External links
 Yale profile

Control theorists
Richard E. Bellman Control Heritage Award recipients
Harvard School of Engineering and Applied Sciences alumni
Yale School of Engineering & Applied Science faculty
Living people
Year of birth missing (living people)